Omar Namsaoui is a Moroccan professional footballer, who plays as a right back for RS Berkane.

Honours
Maghreb de Fès
Moroccan Throne Cup: 2016

RS Berkane
Moroccan Throne Cup: 2018
CAF Confederation Cup: 2020; 2019 (runner-up)

References

1990 births
Living people
People from Fez, Morocco
Moroccan footballers
Maghreb de Fès players
RS Berkane players
Association football fullbacks
2020 African Nations Championship players
Morocco A' international footballers